This is a list of the number-one hits of 1968 on Italian Hit Parade Singles Chart.

See also
1968 in music
List of number-one hits in Italy

References

1968 in Italian music
1968 record charts
1968